Copper Cliff South Mine is an underground nickel mine in Copper Cliff, Ontario, Canada.  It is owned and operated by Vale Canada Limited.

Part of the mine is located under the town of Copper Cliff, which means that additional care must be put into the crown pillar.

See also
Copper Cliff North Mine
List of nickel mines in Canada
List of mines in Ontario

References

Mines in Greater Sudbury
Nickel mines in Canada
Underground mines in Canada